Bosque is an unincorporated community in Valencia County, New Mexico, United States. Bosque has a post office with ZIP code 87006. It was named for its location in the bosque of the Rio Grande valley. The town has been settled since 1750, when several Hispanicized tribes farmed here.

References

Unincorporated communities in Valencia County, New Mexico
Unincorporated communities in New Mexico